There have been two baronetcies created for persons with the surname Craig, both in the Baronetage of the United Kingdom.

The Craig Baronetcy, of Craigavon, was created in the Baronetage of the United Kingdom on 5 February 1918. For more information on this creation, see the Viscount Craigavon.

The Craig Baronetcy, of Alsager in the County of Chester, was created in the Baronetage of the United Kingdom on 1 July 1927 for Ernest Craig, Conservative Member of Parliament for Crewe from 1912 to 1918 and 1924 to 1929. The title became extinct on his death in 1933.

Craig baronets, of Craigavon (1918)
see the Viscount Craigavon

Craig baronets, of Alsager (1927)
Sir Ernest Craig, 1st Baronet (1859–1933)

See also
 Gibson-Craig-Carmichael baronets

References
Kidd, Charles, Williamson, David (editors). Debrett's Peerage and Baronetage (1990 edition). New York: St Martin's Press, 1990.

Baronetcies in the Baronetage of the United Kingdom
Extinct baronetcies in the Baronetage of the United Kingdom